Patrick O'Neill (born 12 January 1971) is an Irish former hurler. At club level he played with Young Irelands and was also a member of the Kilkenny senior hurling team. He usually lined out as a centre-back.

Career
O'Neill first came to prominence at juvenile and underage levels with the Young Irelands club before eventually joining the club's top adult team. He had his first success in 1992 when Young Irelands won the County Intermediate Championship before claiming County Senior Championship titles in 1996 and 2002. O'Neill first appeared on the inter-county scene as part of the 1988 All-Ireland Championship-winning minor team, before later claiming an All-Ireland Championship title with the under-21 team. This success saw him drafted onto the Kilkenny senior hurling team in 1991. O'Neill was centre-back on the Kilkenny team that won consecutive All-Ireland Championship titles in 1992 and 1993. His other honours include a National League titles, five Leinster Championship medals, a Railway Cup title with Leinster and an All-Star Award. O'Neill's last major game was the 1999 All-Ireland final defeat by Cork.

Honours

Team
Young Irelands
Kilkenny Senior Hurling Championship: 1996, 2002
Kilkenny Intermediate Hurling Championship: 1992

Kilkenny
All-Ireland Senior Hurling Championship: 1992, 1993
Leinster Senior Hurling Championship: 1991, 1992, 1993, 1998, 1999
National Hurling League: 1994-95
All-Ireland Under-21 Hurling Championship: 1990
Leinster Under-21 Hurling Championship: 1990
All-Ireland Minor Hurling Championship: 1988
Leinster Minor Hurling Championship: 1988

Leinster
Railway Cup: 1993

Individual
Awards
All-Star Award: 1993
All-Ireland Senior Hurling Championship Final man of the match: 1993

References

1971 births
Living people
Young Irelands (Kilkenny) hurlers
Kilkenny inter-county hurlers
Leinster inter-provincial hurlers
All-Ireland Senior Hurling Championship winners
Irish electricians